Rank comparison chart of officers for air forces of Arabophone states.

Officers

References

Military comparisons